Wang Xuanxuan (b January 26, 1990, Changzhou) is a Chinese heavyweight amateur boxer who won Bronze at the 2011 World Amateur Boxing Championships (results).

At the 2011 World Amateur Boxing Championships he beat three Asian boxers before losing to Teymur Mammadov, his result meant he qualified for the Olympics 2012. At the Chinese Championships he defeated Wang Jianzheng.

At the 2012 Olympics he lost his first bout to Bulgarian Tervel Pulev 7:10.

References

External links
AIBA Bio

1990 births
Living people
Boxers at the 2012 Summer Olympics
Heavyweight boxers
Olympic boxers of China
Boxers at the 2014 Asian Games
Chinese male boxers
AIBA World Boxing Championships medalists
Sportspeople from Changzhou
Asian Games competitors for China
21st-century Chinese people